Khvalynsk Hills is a hilly region in Saratov Oblast and Penza Oblast, Russia.

A  sector of the hills is a protected area under the name Khvalynsky National Park, which was established in 1994.

Geography
The Khvalynsk Mountains are a group of smooth hills in the East European Plain, extending on the right bank of the Volga. They are one of the highest of the subranges of the Volga Uplands. They are mostly located in the Saratov Oblast, with a small part in southeastern Penza Oblast. The hill zone is sparsely populated. Villages such as Pikhankino (Пиксанкино), Novaya Yaksarka (Новая Яксарка), Staraya Yaksarka (Старая Яксарка), Novy Machim (Новый Мачим), Russkaya Norka (Русская Норка), Mordovskaya Norka (Мордовская Норка), Rango Lisma (Ранго-Лисьма), Vilyayevka (Виляевка), Ivanovka (Ивановка —Шемышейский район), Yango-Prya (Янго-Пря), Ust-Murza (Усть-Мурза), Vorobyovka (Воробьёвка —Шемышейский район), Azrapino (Азрапино —Пензенская область), Naumkino (Наумкино —Пензенская область), Dubrovka-on-Uze (Дубровка-на-Узе), Staroye Zakharkino (Старое Захаркино), Staroye Demkino (Старое Демкино), Ust-Uza (Усть-Уза), Peschanka (Песчанка —Шемышейский район), Aleksandro-Bogdanovka (Александро-Богдановка), Koldais (Колдаис), Neklyudovo (Неклюдово —Пензенская область), Karzhimant (Каржимант), Arapino (Арапино) and Neverkino, are scattered throughout the hill area, but cities are only found in the periphery.

Both summits are unnamed. There are also white chalk hills among pine forests that are a tourist attraction.

See also
Highest points of Russian Federal subjects
List of mountains and hills of Russia

References

External links

Хвалынский район - Большая Саратовская Энциклопедия

Penza Oblast
Saratov Oblast